Austin Spitler (born October 26, 1986) is a former American football linebacker. He was drafted by the Miami Dolphins in the seventh round of the 2010 NFL Draft. He played college football at Ohio State where he was a starter and captain. He has since retired.

Professional career

Miami Dolphins
Spitler was drafted by the Miami Dolphins with the 252nd overall pick of the 2010 NFL Draft.

Baltimore Ravens
Spitler signed with the Baltimore Ravens on June 19, 2014. The Ravens released Spitler on August 25, 2014.

Washington Redskins
Spitler signed a futures contract with the Washington Redskins on January 8, 2015. He was waived by the Redskins on May 4.

References

External links
Ohio State Buckeyes football bio
Miami Dolphins bio

1986 births
Living people
Players of American football from Dayton, Ohio
American football linebackers
Ohio State Buckeyes football players
Miami Dolphins players
Baltimore Ravens players
Washington Redskins players
People from Bellbrook, Ohio